Aq Beraz (also known as Āq Barār) is a village in Chahardangeh-ye Shomali Rural District of Chahardangeh District, Hurand County, East Azerbaijan province, Iran. At the 2006 National Census, its population was 740 in 142 households, when it was in the former Hurand District of Ahar County. The following census in 2011 counted 754 people in 171 households. The latest census in 2016 showed a population of 654 people in 174 households; it is the center of its rural district.

References 

Populated places in East Azerbaijan Province